Reginald Newnham Ellis (22 February 1891 – 26 May 1959) was an Australian sportsman who played first-class cricket for Victoria and Australian rules football in the Victorian Football League (VFL).

Football

St Kilda (VFL)
Ellis, a defender, played 53 games in the VFL, all but one of them for St Kilda from 1913 to 1915. He had been recruited from Sydney and participated in St Kilda's 1913 VFL Grand Final loss to Fitzroy.

Melbourne (VFL)
In 1920, after not playing at all during the war, Ellis returned to the league and signed up with Melbourne. He made just one appearance for the club.

Cricket
His cricket career began over seven years after he played his last VFL game and he was aged 36 when he made his first-class debut against Tasmania. The Victorian opening pair in the first innings of Fred Baring and Basil Onyons were also league footballers, as was their wicket-keeper Stuart King. Ellis came in at three and made just the one run before being dismissed. He made amends in the second innings with a century. His even hundred allowed Victoria to chase their fourth innings target of 182 with five wickets in hand.

Ellis went on to represent Victoria in the 1928–29 and 1929–30 Sheffield Shield seasons. He finished with 355 runs from his seven first-class matches at an average of 29.58. His only other century came in a Shield encounter against Queensland at the MCG in 1928 when he made an unbeaten 107. Ellis also took three wickets in his career, including dismissing Test player Alan Fairfax.

See also
 1911 Adelaide Carnival
 List of Victoria first-class cricketers

Footnotes

References
 Reginald Newnham Ellis, at New South Wales Australian Football History Society.

External links
 
 Reg Ellis, Demonwiki.
 Reginald Newnham Ellis, New South Wales Australian Football History Society. 
 Cricinfo Profile: Reg Ellis

1891 births
1959 deaths
Australian rules footballers from New South Wales
Australian Rules footballers: place kick exponents
St Kilda Football Club players
Melbourne Football Club players
Australian cricketers
Victoria cricketers
Cricketers from Sydney
Australian military personnel of World War I
Military personnel from Sydney